Stanislaus Sittenfeld (11 July 1865, Piotrków, Poland – 15 June 1902 in Davos, Switzerland) was a Polish–French chess master.

Born in Poland, he lived in Paris from 1884. He participated at the Café de la Régence championships in Paris and took 3rd place in 1890 and 1892. Both events were won by Alphonse Goetz.

Sittenfeld played several matches in Paris. In 1891 he drew with Jean Taubenhaus and won against Dawid Janowski. In 1892 he lost to Janowski and drew with him in 1893.

In 1901 he tied for 1st–2nd with Adolf Albin in Paris (Quadrangular).

References

External links
Short Bio in French with a photo

1865 births
1902 deaths
19th-century Polish Jews
Polish chess players
French chess players
Jewish chess players
People from Piotrków County
Sportspeople from Łódź Voivodeship
19th-century chess players